X38 may refer to:
 NASA X-38, an American experimental aircraft tested by NASA
  Intel X38 chipset for the Intel Core 2